Aygedzor may refer to:
Aygedzor, Tavush, Armenia
Aygedzor, northern Syunik, Armenia
Aygedzor, southern Syunik, Armenia
Aygezard, Ararat, Armenia